Zinthia de los Ángeles Benavides Hernández (born 31 December 1969) is a Mexican politician from the National Action Party. In 2003 she served as Deputy of the LVIII Legislature of the Mexican Congress representing Nuevo León.

References

1969 births
Living people
Politicians from Nuevo León
Women members of the Chamber of Deputies (Mexico)
National Action Party (Mexico) politicians
21st-century Mexican politicians
21st-century Mexican women politicians
Universidad Regiomontana alumni
Deputies of the LVIII Legislature of Mexico
Members of the Chamber of Deputies (Mexico) for Nuevo León